Whitefield College of the Bible is an independent theological college located in Northern Ireland. It is operated by the Free Presbyterian Church of Ulster. The college currently holds lectures in Martyrs Memorial Free Presbyterian Church in Belfast. The college has no association with any governmental education system due to its fundamentalist approach and receives no state funding or support.

About the college

The college was named after the 18th century Evangelist, George Whitefield. A portrait by Samuel McCausland was commissioned for the opening.

The college was formally opened on 3 October 1981 by Bob Jones, chancellor of Bob Jones University, South Carolina, USA, after receiving the key from the president of the college Ian Paisley. 

The purchase and renovation of the mansion housing the college cost £170,000 (approximately £455,600 in 2007).

Office of the college

The principal is Timothy Nelson. John Douglas retired from the post in 2013.

Course

Whitefield offers a 4-year course which is compulsory for entry into the ministry of the Free Presbyterian Church of Ulster. It comprises

 Missionary principles
 Cults
 English
 Systematic theology
 Pastoral theology
 Bible survey
 Christian ethics
 Personal Evangelism and Christian doctrine
Homiletics
Exegesis
Hermeneutics
Historical theology
Greek (2-year)
Hebrew (1-year)

Whitefield also offers a 2-year basic course for Christian workers and those preparing for the mission field. It is the same as the above but without Hebrew language and systematic theology.

References

External links

Bible colleges, seminaries and theological colleges in Northern Ireland
Presbyterian universities and colleges
Fundamentalist Christian universities and colleges
Educational institutions established in 1981